Bugaku is a ballet made by New York City Ballet co-founder and ballet master George Balanchine to eponymous music by Toshiro Mayuzumi, commissioned by City Ballet in 1962. The premiere took place on 30 March 1963 at City Center of Music and Drama, New York, with scenery by David Hays, costumes by Karinska, and lighting by Ronald Bates. NYCB had toured Japan in 1958 and the Gagaku Company of the Imperial Household toured the US the following year.

Bugaku is the dance component of gagaku.

Original cast
Allegra Kent
Edward Villella

References 

Playbill, New York City Ballet, Saturday, May 10, 2008
Repertory Week, New York City Ballet, Spring Season, 2008 repertory, week 2

Reviews 

NY Times review by Allen Hughes, August 30, 1963
NY Times review by Clive Barnes, November 20, 1976
NY Times review by Anna Kisselgoff, April 29, 1984
NY Times review by Anna Kisselgoff, March 20, 1987
NY Times review by Alastair Macaulay, January 19, 2008
review in the New York Sun by Joel Lobenthal, June 1, 2007
review by Deborah Jowitt in the Village Voice, February 5, 2008
review in Dance View Times by Alexandra Tomalonis, November 25, 2007

Articles 

NY Times article by Allen Hughes, March 22, 1963
NY Times article by Anna Kisselgoff, April 5, 1987

External links 

 Bugaku on the website of the Balanchine Trust

Ballets by George Balanchine
Ballets by Toshiro Mayuzumi
1963 ballet premieres
Ballets designed by David Hays
Ballets designed by Ronald Bates
Ballets designed by Barbara Karinska
New York City Ballet repertory